Hugh of Vermandois (920 – 962) was the archbishop of Reims from 925 to 931, when he was removed from office by the actions of Hugh the Great and others, his father Herbert II, Count of Vermandois who had been the power behind his episcopate was driven out of Reims and the bishopric was then assumed by Artoldus.

Hugh had been made bishop at the age of five, which makes him one of the youngest bishops ever. Abbo, bishop of Soissons, administered the spiritual affairs of the diocese during Hugh's minority.

From 940 to 946 Hugh again served as bishop of Reims, making him a full 26 years old when he ended his time as bishop.  He was again ousted by war and replaced by Artoldus in 946.

In 961 after Artoldus' death there was an attempt to restore Hugh to his episcopal office, however Pope John XII decided against this and instead made Odelricus the new bishop.  At this point Hugh was also excommunicated. He died at Meaux in 962.

Sources
Annals of Flodoard, p. 21

Herbertien dynasty
10th-century archbishops
Archbishops of Reims
920 births
962 deaths
People excommunicated by the Catholic Church